The Ministry of Education and Higher Education of the Palestinian National Authority is the branch of the Palestinian government in charge of managing the education in the Palestinian territories. It was established in 1994 after the formation of the Palestinian National Authority.

Nasser al-Shaer, the former Minister of Education was arrested by Israeli authorities twice for membership in Hamas and released both times. After the Hamas takeover of the Gaza Strip in June 2007, President Mahmoud Abbas dismissed all Hamas ministers including Shaer. The newly appointed Minister of Education under the internationally recognized Fatah government in the West Bank became Marwan Awartani.

Activities
Throughout 2001-2005, the ministry finalized the establishment of a Palestinian national curriculum by hiring teachers and providing classrooms and books.

The five programs of the plan were:
 Education as a human right Aim to provide an opportunity for all children from kindergarten to secondary school, by recruiting new teachers, adding new classrooms, textbooks, increasing the level of enrollment in the secondary stage, and decreasing the dropout rate. 
 Education as the basic component of citizenship Developing quality education is the production, assessment, evaluation, and enrichment of school textbooks and instruction manuals for the Palestinian Curriculum as well as teacher and supervisor training. 
 Education as a tool for social and economic development  Developing a vocational and technical training program aiming to meet the basic needs of the local market, and providing a skilled workforce that can contribute positively to the national economy. Providing schools with the necessary equipment and resources. 
 Education as a tool for social and economic development  Developing new programs for general education, pre-school, informal education, adult education, and special education, that is available for the general population.
 Education as a continuous, renewable, participatory process  Restructuring the financial and administrative systems to ensure efficient use of available resources. The program will include the school-map project, as well as reinforce concepts of strategic planning and organizational administration. Also, developing and reviewing policies, and rules and regulations; updating of position responsibilities and job descriptions; and developing relations between schools and the local community.

Other activities are training and providing income for teachers, increasing the quality of school technology as well as expanding and building new schools.

Education Minister

References

External links
 Official website 
Education ministries
1994 establishments in the Palestinian territories